Anupurath Krishnankutty, popularly known as Mundur Krishnankutty (17 July 1935 – 4 June 2005), was a Malayalam–language writer from Kerala state, India.

Life
He was born in Mundur in Palghat to parents Manakulangara Govinda Pisharody and Anupurath Madhavi Pisharasyar. He attended Parali High School and mastered in English literature at Government Victoria College, Palakkad. He obtained a B.Ed degree from NSS College, Ottapalam and worked as a teacher in Palakkad VVP High School, Palakkad PMG High School and Chittoor Training School.

He wrote his first short story "Kannalichekkan" (Cow boy) in 1956 which was published in Navayugam. The same year another story titled "Ambalavasikal" (Temple workers) was published in the Mathrubhumi Illustrated Weekly. He won many awards including the Odakkuzhal Award, Kerala Sahitya Akademi Award and the Cherukad Award for his short stories. 

Krishnankutty died on 4 June 2005. 

Several literary organisations have instituted awards in his memory. This includes a literary award presented annually by Mundur Krishnankutty Memorial Trust, another by Nawab Rajendran Samiti (since 2005) and a short story award instituted by Saparya Sahitya Vedi.

List of works

Short story collections
 Nilappisukkulla Oru Rathriyil
 Aswasathinte Manthracharadu
 Ethratholamennariyathe
 Moonnamathoral
 Enne Veruthe Vittalum
 Kathapurushan
 Avaseshippinte Pakshi
 Ammakku Vendi
 Thannishtathinte Vazhithappukal
 Mundoor Krishnankuttiyude Sampoorna Krithikal (in 2 volumes)
 Evideyo thornnutheerunna mazha

Others
 Mathuvinte Krishnathanuppu (short novel)
 Ekaki (short novel)
 Manassu Enna Bharam (short novel)
 Oru Adhyapakante Athmagathangal (memoirs)

Awards

 1996: Cherukad Award–Nilappisukkulla Oru Rathriyil
 1997: Kerala Sahitya Akademi Award for Story–Nilappisukkulla Oru Rathriyil
 2003: Odakkuzhal Award–Enne Veruthe Vittalum

References

1935 births
2005 deaths
People from Palakkad district
Writers from Kerala
Male actors from Kerala
Indian male novelists
Indian male short story writers
Indian male film actors
Malayalam-language writers
Malayalam novelists
Malayalam short story writers
Recipients of the Kerala Sahitya Akademi Award
Government Victoria College, Palakkad alumni
Male actors in Malayalam cinema
20th-century Indian novelists
Male actors in Malayalam television
Indian male television actors
20th-century Indian short story writers
20th-century Indian male actors
Indian memoirists
20th-century Indian male writers
20th-century memoirists